Wunna Kyawhtin Thet Tun (6 August 1926 – 4 July 2012) was a Burmese ambassador, writer and historian.

Early life and education 

He was born in Yangon, Myanmar on 6 August 1926. His father is Phoe Thaung and his mother is Sein Toke.

He attended at Basic Education High School No. 2 Dagon. He graduated from Yangon University and also received a Bachelor of Science degree from the University of London.

Published books

In the Footsteps of Kinwun (ကင်းဝန်ခြေရာ လိုက်၍သာ) -1998 (won Myanmar National Literature Award)
Bilingual Essays (သံတို့ အမြင်)-1999
Contemporary Myanmar & Selected Writings (မျက်မှောက်ခေတ် မြန်မာနှင့် အခြား အင်္ဂလိပ်−မြန်မာ နှစ်ဘာသာဆောင်းပါးများ)-2002
Experiences Abroad (နိုင်ငံရပ်ခြား အတွေ့အကြုံများ)
The Writings of General Aung San
Portraits and Vignettes of Myanmar Personalities (သူတို့အကြောင်း တစေ့တစောင်း)
A Myanmar Looks at Others (မြန်မာတစ်ဦး၏ ကမ္ဘာ့အမြင်)
Myanmar Politics 1958-1962
Selected Writings of Retired Ambassador U Thet Htun

Personal life
He married Khin Khin Ohn. They have two children.

References

1926 births
2012 deaths
20th-century Burmese historians
21st-century Burmese historians
Recipients of the Wunna Kyawhtin